João Bruno Pereira Monteiro (born 11 January 1998) is a Portuguese professional footballer who plays for Felgueiras 1932 as a midfielder.

Football career
On 13 May 2018, Bruno made his professional debut with  Vitória Guimarães B in a 2017–18 LigaPro match against Nacional.

References

External links

1998 births
Living people
Sportspeople from Guimarães
Portuguese footballers
Association football midfielders
Liga Portugal 2 players
Vitória S.C. B players
F.C. Felgueiras 1932 players
Portugal youth international footballers